Nancy Hays Teeters (July 29, 1930 – November 17, 2014) was an American economist and corporate executive who served as a member of the Federal Reserve Board of Governors from 1978 to 1984. A member of the Democratic Party, Teeters was the first woman to sit on the Board. She was nominated by President Jimmy Carter to fill out the remainder of the term of Arthur F. Burns, a former chairman of the Fed. Teeters was known for her public statements in which she dissented from the mainstream opinion of the Board and Chairman Paul Volcker.

Early life and education
Teeters was the youngest of three children born to Edgar Hayes, a box salesman, and Mabel, a homemaker. She received a bachelor's degree from Oberlin College in 1952 and a master's degree from the University of Michigan in 1954, both in economics.

Career
In 1957, Teeters joined the Federal Reserve as a staff economist in the Division of Research and Statistics. From 1962 to 1963, she worked as an economist on the staff of the Council of Economic Advisers, then led by Chair Walter Heller. She returned to the Fed for three years and also spent time with the Bureau of the Budget (predecessor of the Office of Management and Budget, the Brookings Institution, and the Congressional Research Service prior to her appointment to the Board of Governors of the Federal Reserve.

After leaving the Fed, she joined IBM as director of economics, and was elected an IBM vice president and chief economist in 1986; the second woman to hold the post. Teeters served in that capacity until her retirement in 1990.  She died on November 17, 2014 at the age of 84.

References

External links

1930 births
2014 deaths
20th-century American businesspeople
20th-century American businesswomen
20th-century American economists
American computer businesspeople
American women economists
Businesspeople from Indiana
Carter administration personnel
Economists from Indiana
Federal Reserve economists
Federal Reserve System governors
IBM employees
IBM Women
Oberlin College alumni
People from Marion, Indiana
Reagan administration personnel
University of Michigan alumni